House is a clothing brand and retailer chain, owned by the LPP. Its headquarters are located in Gdańsk, Poland. In 2021, company owed 322 stores, including 170 stores in Poland, and 141 in other countries across Europe. Additionally, it operated online retail in 13 countries. It was established in 2001 by Artman company, and bought by LPP in 2009.

Stores 
In 2021, company owned 322 stores, including 170 stores in Poland, and 141 in other countries across Europe including Bosnia and Herzegovina, Bulgaria, Croatia, Czech Republic, Estonia, Finland, Hungary, Kazakhstan, Latvia, Lithuania, Poland, Romania, Russia, Serbia, Slovakia, Slovenia, and Ukraine.
Additionally, it operated online retail in 13 countries (Croatia, Czech Republic, Estonia, Germany, Hungary, Latvia, Lithuania, Poland, Romania, Russia, Slovakia, Slovenia, and Ukraine).

In 2022, following the Russian invasion of Ukraine, the company closed its stores in Ukraine.

Gallery

References

External links 
 Official website

Retail companies of Poland
Multinational companies headquartered in Poland
Clothing companies of Poland
Polish brands
Clothing brands
Companies based in Gdańsk
Polish companies established in 2001